The Gooiboog (Dutch for Gooi Curve) is a railway chord which links the Dutch Flevolijn and Gooilijn railway lines.

The link is double tracked. The outer, southbound line is 2200 metres long, the inner northbound one is 1400 metre. The outer track is in a dive-under, running beneath the surface level for about 1500 metres, diving underneath the Gooilijn.

The Gooiboog offers a direct link between Almere, Hilversum and Utrecht.

History
In 1980 work began on the construction of the Flevolijn and in 1987 the line opened as far as Almere Buiten. In 1988 the line was extended to Lelystad. As early as 1987 the possibility of a link to Hilversum, Utrecht and Amersfoort was discussed. At present there is still no link between Almere and Amersfoort.

At first it was planned to build a fly-over but residents of Weesp complained it would ruin their view of the Naardermeer. 

Construction started in 2000, with the first services running on 14 December 2003.

Gooiboog use
The regular service over the Gooiboog is the half-hourly Almere Centrum - Hilversum - Utrecht Centraal service. During evenings and Sundays this service is reduced an hourly frequency.

References 

Rail infrastructure in the Netherlands
Buildings and structures in North Holland
Railway lines opened in 2003